Fredrick Patacchia Jr. (born December 15, 1981) is an American professional surfer. He retired from the World Surf League after a perfect 10 at the Hurley Pro at Lower Trestles on September 9, 2015.

Patacchia was raised on the North Shore of Oahu, Hawaii.

Patacchia began his elite tour campaign in 2005. In the same year he won the 2005 ASP Rookie of the Year award when he finished the season in 14th place.

His highest ASP World Tour rating was 12th in 2006 and 2008. 2015 marks his 11th season on tour.

His total career earnings are $931,250.

Patacchia is sponsored by Quiksilver and Bud Light.

He had a brief role in the movie Blue Crush as a local Hawaiian surfer.

In January 2011, he married Melissa Gomez and they have a daughter born December 2011.

Rating history on the WSL Championship Tour
2015: 32nd
2014: 21st
2013: 19th
2012: 30th
2011: 24th
2010: 19th
2009: 15th
2008: 12th
2007: 23rd
2006: 17th
2005: 14th

References

American surfers
1981 births
Living people
World Surf League surfers